Leptodactylus latinasus (common name: oven frog, in Spanish urnero) is a species of frog in the family Leptodactylidae.
It is found in the Gran Chaco of northern Argentina, Bolivia, and Paraguay and east and south to southern Brazil and Uruguay.
Its natural habitats are subtropical or tropical grasslands near waterbodies. It tolerates anthropogenic disturbance well. It breeds in underground chambers. This abundant and adaptable species is not facing any important threats.

It is now known to have kneecaps, a feature previously unknown in amphibians and thought to have evolved in different taxonomic classes, the reptile and the mammal.

References

latinasus
Amphibians of Argentina
Amphibians of Bolivia
Amphibians of Brazil
Amphibians of Paraguay
Amphibians of Uruguay
Amphibians described in 1875
Taxa named by Marcos Jiménez de la Espada
Taxonomy articles created by Polbot